HMS Hussar was a 28-gun  sixth-rate frigate of the Royal Navy. Hussar was first commissioned in May 1790 under the command of Captain Eliab Harvey.

Career
From 1792-1794, Captain Sir Rupert George used the Hussar as his flagship when he was the Commodore of the North America Station.

The French made a line of battle to receive the British frigates. An action commenced, with three of the French vessels eventually striking their colours. Thetis took possession of the largest, which turned out to be , pierced for 36 guns but only mounting 24. Hussar captured a second, Raison, pierced for 24 guns but only mounting 18. One of the vessels that had struck nonetheless sailed off. Two of the five had broken off the fight and sailed off earlier. (The three that escaped were Normand, Trajan, and Hernoux.) An hour after she had struck, Prévoyantes main and foremasts fell over the side. In the battle, Thetis had lost eight men killed and 9 wounded; Hussar had only two men wounded.

Four of the French ships had escaped from Guadeloupe on 25 April. They had sailed to American ports to gather provisions and naval stores to bring back to France.

Cochrane had intended to leave the prizes in charge of the cutter Prince Edward after repairing the damage to his vessel during the night. However, a breeze picked up and by morning the escaping French vessels were out of sight. The British sailed with their prizes to Halifax. The British took Prévoyante into the Royal Navy as HMS Prevoyante.

On 20 July, Hussar was in company with Thetis and  when they intercepted the American vessel Cincinnatus, of Wilmington, sailing from Ireland to Wilmington. They pressed many men on board, narrowly exempting the Irish revolutionary Wolfe Tone, who was going to Philadelphia.

Citations

References
 Robert Gardiner, The First Frigates, Conway Maritime Press, London 1992. .
 David Lyon, The Sailing Navy List, Conway Maritime Press, London 1993. .
 Rif Winfield, British Warships in the Age of Sail, 1714 to 1792, Seaforth Publishing, London 2007. .

External links
 

 

1784 ships
Sixth-rate frigates of the Royal Navy
Ships built in Kent